The Caledon Admirals are a Junior 'A' ice hockey team based in Caledon, Ontario, Canada. They are a part of the Ontario Junior Hockey League.

History

Henry Carr
The Admirals lineage traces back to the Henry Carr Crusaders.  Like the Toronto St. Michael's Majors and St. Michael's Buzzers, the Crusaders were a secondary school based junior hockey team.  The team's affiliation was with the Father Henry Carr Secondary School of the Toronto Catholic District School Board.  In 1980, they took their high school team and joined the Metro Junior "B" Hockey League, where they played until 1991, even after the league left the Ontario Hockey Association in 1989. The team was famous for its first undefeated Metro season in 1983 (34–0–2), when they won the All-Ontario Jr. B Championship, the Sutherland Cup.  After five rounds of playoffs competing for the Sutherland Cup, the Crusaders accumulated 54 wins, 2 losses, 2 ties, and 2 losses in overtime in 60 regulation games.

In 1991, when the Metro league declared itself Junior "A" and they transferred the franchise to the Weston Dukes.  Henry Carr used to field a team at the high school hockey level as well.

Thornhill
In 1993, the Weston Dukes organization folded and their franchise was moved to Thornhill and became the Thornhill Islanders.  In 1997, they were renamed the Thornhill Rattlers until 2004, when they assumed the Thunderbirds name.

After playing in multiple league over many years, even competing for the 2001 Royal Bank Cup.  In summer 2006, the players of the team started to get let go or traded for cash to any interested team.  The team was for sale for the better part of six months, but with no serious offers.

Villanova Knights
In 2007, local businessman David Arsenault (governor and owner) along with St. Thomas of Villanova College revived the team bringing it back into the OPJHL under the Villanova College name.

The Villanova Knights were announced officially on May 15, 2007.  The team played their home games at York University's Canlan Ice Gardens.

Orangeville Jr. Flyers
The original Orangeville Flyers were disbanded by the league in spring 2011. On April 14, 2011, ten days after the Flyers folded, the OJHL and the Villanova Knights announced that they were moving to Orangeville under the name Orangeville Flyers.

Brampton Admirals
On June 18, 2018, team president David Arsenault, citing poor local support in Orangeville and an improved development model by having both his junior "A" and Junior "B" teams playing in the same arena, relocated and rebranded the Orangeville Flyers as the Brampton Admirals. In 2021 the team relocated to Caledon, Ontario and were renamed the Caledon Admirals. They currently play out of the Mayfield Recreation Centre.

Season-by-season standings

Playoffs
MetJHL Years
1990 Lost Semi-final
Henry Carr Crusaders defeated Mimico Monarchs 4-games-to-none
Thornhill Thunderbirds defeated Henry Carr Crusaders 4-games-to-2
1991 Lost Semi-final
Henry Carr Crusaders defeated St. Michael's Buzzers 4-games-to-none 
Bramalea Blues defeated Henry Carr Crusaders 4-games-to-2
1992 Lost Preliminary
St. Michael's Buzzers defeated Weston Dodgers 3-games-to-none
1993 DNQ
1994 Lost Semi-final
Thornhill Islanders defeated Wellington Dukes 4-games-to-1
Wexford Raiders defeated Thornhill Islanders 4-games-to-none
1995 Lost Semi-final
Thornhill Islanders defeated Kingston Voyageurs 4-games-to-none
Wexford Raiders defeated Thornhill Islanders 4-games-to-3
1996 Lost Final
Thornhill Islanders defeated Markham Waxers 4-games-to-1
Thornhill Islanders defeated Wexford Raiders 4-games-to-2
Caledon Canadians defeated Thornhill Islanders 4-games-to-3
1997 Lost Round Robin Quarter-final
Thornhill Islanders defeated Markham Waxers 4-games-to-3
Fifth in round robin quarter-final (2-4)
1998 Lost Quarter-final
Thornhill Rattlers defeated Huntsville Wildcats 3-games-to-1
Syracuse Jr. Crunch defeated Thornhill Rattlers 3-games-to-1
OJHL Years
1999 Lost Division Quarter-final
Couchiching Terriers defeated Thornhill Rattlers 3-games-to-2
2000 Lost Conference Final
Thornhill Rattlers defeated Oshawa Legionaires 4-games-to-1
Thornhill Rattlers defeated Wexford Raiders 4-games-to-1
Thornhill Rattlers defeated Vaughan Vipers 4-games-to-none
Lindsay Muskies defeated Thornhill Rattlers 4-games-to-1
2001 Won League, Won OHF Ruddock Trophy, Won Dudley Hewitt Cup, Lost 2001 Royal Bank Cup round robin
Thornhill Rattlers defeated Huntsville Wildcats 4-games-to-none
Thornhill Rattlers defeated St. Michael's Buzzers 4-games-to-none
Thornhill Rattlers defeated Wexford Raiders 4-games-to-2
Thornhill Rattlers defeated Trenton Sting 4-games-to-1
Thornhill Rattlers defeated Couchiching Terriers 4-games-to-1 OPJHL CHAMPIONS
Thornhill Rattlers defeated Rayside-Balfour Sabrecats (NOJHL) 4-games-to-3 RUDDOCK TROPHY, DUDLEY HEWITT CUP CHAMPIONS
Fifth and eliminated in 2001 Royal Bank Cup round robin (0-4)
2002 Lost Division Quarter-final
Pickering Panthers defeated Thornhill Rattlers 4-games-to-3
2003 Lost Division Quarter-final
Markham Waxers defeated Thornhill Rattlers 4-games-to-none
2004 Lost Division Quarter-final
Stouffville Spirit defeated Thornhill Rattlers 4-games-to-2
2005 Lost Division Quarter-final
St. Michael's Buzzers defeated Thornhill Thunderbirds 4-games-to-none
2006 Lost Division Quarter-final
Markham Waxers defeated Toronto Thunderbirds 4-games-to-1
2007 Did Not Participate
2008 DNQ
2009 DNQ
2010 Lost OJAHL Quarter-final
Georgetown Raiders defeated Villanova Knights 4-games-to-2
2011 Lost Quarter-final
Villanova Knights defeated Peterborough Stars 4-games-to-1
Wellington Dukes defeated Villanova Knights 4-games-to-1
2012 Lost Division Quarter-final
Aurora Tigers defeated Orangeville Flyers 3-games-to-1

Sutherland Cup appearances
1983: Henry Carr Crusaders defeated Stratford Cullitons 4-games-to-none

Notable alumni
Bob Essensa 	
Patrick Flatley
Manny Legace
Matt Lorito
Steve Moore
Dominic Moore
Jeff O'Neill
Raffi Torres
Mike York

References

External links
Official website

Ontario Provincial Junior A Hockey League teams
Sport in Orangeville, Ontario